Mark Billman (March 10, 1905 – May 30, 1933) was an American racecar driver. He was killed 79 laps into the 1933 Indianapolis 500, his only Championship Car start.

Fatal accident 

On his seventy-ninth lap of the 1933 Indianapolis 500, Billman in the Kemp-Mannix Special skidded on the southeast turn, hit the outside wall and finally came to rest with the car astride the wall. He was pinned between the left front wheel and the wall and it took 20 minutes to get him out. His left arm was torn off, both legs were broken and he was internally injured. In spite of blood transfusions, he died an hour later.

Indy 500 results

References

See also
List of Indianapolis fatalities

1905 births
1933 deaths
Indianapolis 500 drivers
Racing drivers who died while racing
Racing drivers from Indianapolis
Sports deaths in Indiana